Hadenini is a tribe of cutworm or dart moths in the family Noctuidae. There are more than 140 genera and 1,000 described species in Hadenini, found worldwide.

Hadenini was formerly a tribe of the subfamily Hadeninae, but Hadeninae was moved to the subfamily Noctuinae. The tribes Apameini, Caradrinini, Elaphriini, Episemini, Eriopygini, Hadenini, Leucaniini, Orthosiini, and Xylenini were moved from Hadeninae to Noctuinae.

Genera
These 145 genera belong to Hadenini.

 Afotella Barnes & Benjamin, 1925
 Anapoma Berio, 1980
 Anarta Ochsenheimer, 1816
 Anartomorpha Alphéraky, 1892
 Antha Staudinger, 1892
 Apospasta Fletcher D.S., 1959
 Aspidifrontia Hampson, 1902
 Bambusiphila Sugi, 1958
 Brithysana Viette, 1963
 Calpiformis Hampson, 1908
 Campydelta Berio, 1964
 Capillamentum Pinhey, 1956
 Caradjia Zerny, 1928
 Cardepia Hampson, 1905
 Catamecia Staudinger, 1898
 Catasema Staudinger, 1888
 Centrochlora Dyar, 1912
 Ceramica Guenée, 1852
 Chabuata Walker, 1858
 Chandata Moore, 1882
 Chlorognesia Warren, 1913
 Chortodes 
 Cirrodes Hampson, 1910
 Clavipalpula Staudinger, 1892
 Clemathada Beck, 1996
 Closteromorpha R.Felder, 1874
 Cnodifrontia Hampson, 1902
 Conicofrontia Hampson, 1902
 Conisania Hampson, 1905
 Copifrontia Hampson, 1905
 Coranarta Beck, 1991
 Cornutifera Varga & Ronkay, 1991
 Craterestra Hampson, 1905
 Crosia Dupont, 1910
 Ctenoceratoda Varga, 1992
 Cyclopera Hampson, 1908
 Cyptonychia Hampson, 1900
 Cytocanis Hampson, 1910
 Cytothymia Hampson, 1908
 Dargida Walker, 1856
 Dicerogastra Fletcher D.S., 1961
 Dictyestra Sugi, 1982
 Dimorphicosmia Sugi, 1982
 Diparopsis Hampson, 1902
 Discestra 
 Ebertidia Boursin, 1967
 Ectolopha Hampson, 1902
 Elyptron Saalmüller, 1891
 Enterpia Guenée, 1850
 Eremochroa Meyrick, 1897
 Escaria Grote, 1882
 Ethiopica Hampson, 1909
 Ethioterpia Hampson, 1910
 Eulymnia Hampson, 1908
 Euromoia Staudinger, 1892
 Eurypsyche Butler, 1886
 Euterpiodes Hampson, 1908
 Euxenistis Warren, 1910
 Feredayia Kirkaldy, 1910
 Floccifera 
 Goenycta Hampson, 1909
 Hada Billberg, 1820
 Hadena Schrank, 1802
 Hadenella Grote, 1883
 Haderonia Staudinger, 1895
 Hadula 
 Haplocestra Aurivillius, 1910
 Hecatera Guenée, 1852
 Heterochroma Guenée, 1852
 Hypocalamia Hampson, 1910
 Hypoplexia Hampson, 1908
 Hyporbarathra 
 Interdelta Berio, 1964
 Irene Saldaitis & Benedek, 2017
 Kisegira Hreblay & Ronkay, 1999
 Kollariana Hacker, 1996
 Lacanobia Billberg, 1820
 Lepidodelta Viette, 1967
 Leucapamea Sugi, 1982
 Lophotarsia Hampson, 1902
 Mamestra Ochsenheimer, 1816
 Mammifrontia Barnes & Lindsey, 1922
 Megaegira Ronkay, Ronkay, Gyulai & Hacker, 2010
 Melanchra Hübner, 1820
 Meliana 
 Melionica Berio, 1970
 Mervia Daricheva, 1961
 Mesoplus Boursin, 1949
 Metopiora Meyrick, 1902
 Monostola Alphéraky, 1892
 Multisigna Varga, Ronkay & Ronkay, 2017
 Neopersectania Rodríguez & Angulo, 2007
 Neopistria Hampson, 1908
 Nereisana Strand, 1911
 Niaboma Nye, 1975
 Nyodes Laporte, 1971
 Odontestra Hampson, 1905
 Omphalestra Fletcher D.S., 1961
 Orthogonia Felder & Felder, 1862
 Pachetra Guenée, 1841
 Palponima Hampson, 1905
 Papestra Sukhareva, 1973
 Paracentropus Boursin, 1958
 Paracroria Hampson, 1908
 Polia Ochsenheimer, 1816
 Protomeceras Rebel, 1901
 Pseudamathes Rothschild, 1920
 Pseuderastria Hampson, 1908
 Pseuderiopus Warren, 1913
 Pygmeopolia Hreblay & Ronkay, 1998
 Rhynchoplexia Hampson, 1908
 Rougeotia Laporte, 1974
 Saalmuellerana Fletcher & Viette, 1962
 Sajania A.G. Vologdin, 1962
 Sapporia Sugi, 1982
 Saragossa Staudinger, 1900
 Sarcopolia Sugi, 1982
 Sciomesa Tams & Bowden, 1953
 Scotogramma H. Edwards, 1887
 Scriptania Hampson, 1905
 Selenistis Hampson, 1908
 Sidemia Staudinger, 1892
 Sideridis Hübner, 1821
 Sparkia Nye, 1975
 Speia Tams & Bowden, 1953
 Spiramater McCabe, 1980
 Stauropides Hampson, 1908
 Stomafrontia Hampson, 1905
 Sugiella Özdikmen, 2008
 Syncalama Hampson, 1908
 Thargelia Püngeler, 1899
 Thyatirodes Hampson, 1909
 Thyrestra Hampson, 1905
 Trichanarta Hampson, 1896
 Trichestra Hampson, 1905
 Tricheurois Hampson, 1905
 Trichocosmia Grote, 1883
 Trichordestra McCabe, 1980
 Tridepia McDunnough, 1937
 Trudestra McDunnough, 1937
 Turanica Boursin, 1963
 Tycomarptes Fletcher D.S., 1961
 Vietteania Rungs, 1956
 Xanthiria Hampson, 1910
 Xantholepis Hampson, 1910

References

Further reading

 
 

 
Moth tribes